Club Voleibol Tenerife aka tubillete.com Tenerife Marichal was a Spanish volleyball club who played their home matches at the Pabellón Insular Santiago Martín hall in Tenerife.

The team participates in the Women's CEV Champions League 2007-08. They won that competition in 2003-2004, the only Spanish team ever to do so.

Titles
Superliga Femenina (10)
1992, 1997, 1998, 1999, 2000, 2001, 2002, 2004, 2005, 2006
Copa de la Reina (11)
1991, 1997, 1998, 1999, 2000, 2001, 2002, 2003, 2004, 2005, 2006
Supercopa de España (5)
2002, 2003, 2004, 2005, 2008
CEV Champions League (1)
2003–04

Previous names
2001-2005 Tenerife Marichal
2006-2008 Spar Tenerife Marichal
2008–2009 tubillete.com Tenerife Marichal
2009–2011 Fígaro Peluqueros Tenerife

Notable players
  Elena Godina
  Magaly Carvajal
  Ana Ivis Fernández
  Maurizia Cacciatori
  Anna Vania Mello
  Ingrid Visser
  Yelena Pavlova
  Virginie De Carne
  Mira Golubović
  Suzana Ćebić
  Logan Tom
  Milena Rosner
  Neslihan Demir
  Goya Dorta
  Yasmina Hernández
  Esther López

External links
Official website

Spanish volleyball clubs
Sport in Tenerife
Volleyball clubs established in 1981
Volleyball clubs disestablished in 2011
1981 establishments in Spain
2011 disestablishments in Spain
Sports teams in the Canary Islands